The 1988–89 Polska Liga Hokejowa season was the 54th season of the Polska Liga Hokejowa, the top level of ice hockey in Poland. 10 teams participated in the league, and Polonia Bytom won the championship.

First round

Final round

Qualification round

Playoffs

Quarterfinals 
 Polonia Bytom - Stoczniowiec Gdansk 2:0 (8:1, 16:2)
 Naprzód Janów - KS Cracovia 2:0 (4:3, 8:1)
 Podhale Nowy Targ - Zagłębie Sosnowiec 2:0 (2:1, 6:2)
 GKS Tychy - GKS Katowice 0:2 (3:5, 1:4)

Semifinals
 Polonia Bytom - GKS Katowice 2:0 (12:1, 6:4)
 Naprzód Janów - Podhale Nowy Targ 2:0 (3:2, 2:1)

Final 
 Polonia Bytom - Naprzód Janów 2:1 (3:1, 2:4, 6:1)

Placing round

9th place 
 Towimór Torun - Unia Oświęcim 2:0 (6:4, 4:3 SO)

7th place 
 KS Cracovia - Stoczniowiec Gdansk 2:0 (6:2, 6:2)

5th place 
 Zagłębie Sosnowiec - GKS Tychy 2:1 (5:3, 1:5, 5:2)

3rd place
 Podhale Nowy Targ - GKS Katowice 2:1 (7:1, 1:6, 7:2)

External links
 Season on hockeyarchives.info

1988-89
Pol
Liga